The following is a list of Shia Muslim dynasties.

North Africa and Europe
Idrisid dynasty (788–985 CE) — (Morocco) -    Zaidi
Fatimid Caliphate (909–1171 CE) — (Kabylia) - Ismaili
Banu Kanz (1004–1412 CE) - ( Upper Egypt)  — Ismaili
Zirid dynasty (973–1148 CE) - (Kabylia) — Ismaili 
Kalbids (948–1053) — (Sicily) Ismaili

Iran and Caucasus
Justanids (791–974 CE) — Zaidi
Alavids (864–929 CE) — Zaidi
Aishanids (912–961 CE)
Ziyarid dynasty (928–1043 CE)
Buyid dynasty (934–1062 CE) — Zaidi, later converted to Twelver
Hasanwayhid (959–1047 CE)
Kakuyids (1008–1051 CE)
Nizari Ismaili state (1090–1256 CE) — Nizari
Ilkhanate (1304–1335 CE) 
Sarbadars (1332–1386 CE) — Twelver
Injuids (1335–1357 CE) — Twelver
Marashiyan (1359–1582 CE)
Kara Koyunlu (1375–1468 CE) 
Musha'sha'iyyah dynasty (1436–1729 CE) — Musha'sha
Safavid dynasty (1501–1736 CE) — Twelver
Erivan Khanate (1604–1828 CE)
Afshars (1732-1798 CE)
Baku Khanate (1753–1806 CE)
Derbent Khanate (1747–1806 CE)
Ganja Khanate (1747–1804 CE)
Talysh Khanate (1747–1828 CE)
Nakhichevan Khanate (1747–1813 CE)
Karabakh Khanate (1747–1822 CE)
Javad Khanate (1747-1805 CE)
Zand dynasty (1750–1794 CE)
Qajar dynasty (1785–1925 CE)
Pahlavi dynasty (1925–1979 CE)

Arabian Peninsula

Hijaz
Sharifate of Mecca - Zaidi (converted to Sunnism in the Ottoman period)
Emirate of Medina - Twelver (converted to Sunnism in the Ottoman period)

Yemen
Banu Ukhaidhir (865–1066 CE) — Zaidi
Rassids (897–1970 CE) — Zaidi
Sulayhid dynasty (1047–1138 CE) — Ismaili
Sulaymanids – Ismaili
Hamdanids (Yemen) – Ismaili 
Zurayids - Ismaili
Mutawakkilite Kingdom of Yemen (1926–1970 AD) — Zaidi

Bahrain
Qarmatians (900–1073 CE) — Qarmatian
Uyunid dynasty (1073-1253 CE) — Twelver
Usfurids (1253–1320 CE) — Twelver
Jarwanid dynasty (1305–1487 CE) — Twelver or Ismaili

Levant and Iraq
Hamdanid dynasty (890–1004 CE)
Mazyadids (961–1163 CE) (central and southern Iraq)
Numayrids (990–1081 CE) (eastern Syria and southeastern Turkey)
Uqaylid Dynasty (990–1169 CE)
Mirdasids (1024–1080 CE)
Harfush dynasty (1483–1865 CE)
Ali al-Saghir Dynasty (1710–1980 CE)

Indian subcontinent
Bidar Sultanate (1489–1619 CE)
Berar Sultanate (1490–1572 CE)
Ahmadnagar Sultanate (1490–1636 CE) 
Chak dynasty (1554-1586 CE)
Qutb Shahi dynasty (1512–1687 CE)
Adil Shahi dynasty (1490–1686 CE) 
Najm-i-Sani dynasty (1658–1949 CE)
Nawab of Rampur (1719–1949 CE) 
Nawabs of Oudh (1722–1858 CE)
Nawabs of Bengal (1757–1880 CE)
Talpur dynasty (1783–1843 CE)
Hunza (princely state) (1500s–1974 CE)
Nagar (princely state) (14th Century–1974 CE)
Prithimpassa State (1499-1950)
Banganapalle State (1665-1948)

Southeast Asia
Daya Pasai (1128–1285 CE)
Bandar Kalibah
Moira Malaya
Kanto Kambar
Robaromun

East Africa
Kilwa Sultanate (957–1506 CE).
Onthanusi Sultanate

See also
List of Sunni dynasties
List of Muslim states and dynasties
List of Shia Muslims flags

References

 
Shia Muslim dynasties
Shia Muslim dynasties
Shia